Pirsaatçay is a village in the municipality of Qubalıbalaoğlan in the Hajigabul Rayon of Azerbaijan.

References

Populated places in Hajigabul District